Pachachi (in written Arabic, Al-Bahjaji) is a surname. The Pachachi family are a prominenent Sunni Iraqi landowning family. Notable people with the surname include:

 Adnan Pachachi (1923–2019), Iraqi politician,
 Nadim al-pachachi (1914-1976), Iraqi politician,
 Hamdi al-Pachachi (1886-1948), Iraqi politician,
 Muzahim al-Pachachi (1891-1982), Iraqi politician,
 Maysoon Pachachi (born 1947), Iraqi film director

References

Arabic-language surnames